The Ballbreaker World Tour was a concert tour played by the Australian hard rock band AC/DC, in support of their thirteenth studio album Ballbreaker, which was released on 26 September 1995. This tour had 5 legs around the world lasting 11 months starting on 12 January 1996 in Greensboro, North Carolina finishing on 30 November 1996 in Christchurch, New Zealand.

Background
This was Phil Rudd's first tour with the group since he rejoined in 1994. The band started the tour in North America, followed by a European leg and an Australian leg at the end of the tour. The band also performed in South America, playing to audiences of 65,000 in Brazil, Chile and Argentina.

A video was played at the beginning of each concert featuring Beavis and Butt-head. Each concert began with a large wrecking ball dropping down from a 38-foot crane and 'destroying' part of the stage which was a cement wall behind the drum riser, forming a gap in the stage, from which the band would emerge to open the show with "Back in Black". The sound system for the tour carried more than 50,000 watts. Each show would conclude with "For Those About to Rock", which featured six working cannons.

The Wildhearts supported on the second European and third US legs. "It turned from majesty to comedy to tragedy all in one month," shuddered mainstay Ginger. "We got there [the US] and took full advantage of the welcome that America affords a young band, which is as much drugs and alcohol as we could get our hands on – and then, inevitably, we started fighting with each other… I love AC/DC. They turn up, do their job and go. You tour for years and years and you don't do that by hanging out and partying all the time… We managed five dates."

Reception
Brian Gnatt from the Michigan Daily, gave the Detroit performance a positive review. He opened his review, stating that despite the band's ages, they had a lot of untapped energy as they did 22 years ago. Gnatt praised the sound, stating that the guitar licks were as fresh as the day they were recorded as well as Brian Johnson's vocals - stating that they sounded good as ever despite the weakness of his voice on the Ballbreaker album. Also praising the performance of the band, Gnatt stated that it outshone all of the antics on stage, while also stating that Angus Young looked to be having fun while performing to screaming fans.

Dale Martin from the Victoria Advocate had also given the band's performance a positive review. He opened his review, noting that the band thrives on simplicity and is a constant in the music world. The audience at the show as more subdued and expressed many approval, with the audience singing "You Shook Me All Night Long" until they lost their voices. Martin noted on the setlist changes in which the band performed all phases of their career. When Angus Young began his guitar solo, Martin said it lasted forever and that he was all over the place until he disappeared and reappeared on top of a burly security guard. He concluded his review, stating that fans at the end of the show were in awe and probably a little deaf, with sound reading decibels coming in at 129.

Opening acts
 The Poor
 The Wildhearts
 Joe Satriani
 Sepultura

Setlist
"Back in Black"
"Shot Down in Flames"
"Thunderstruck"
"Girls Got Rhythm"
"Cover You in Oil" (Played sometimes instead of "Hail Caesar")
"Shoot to Thrill"
"Hard as a Rock"
"Boogie Man"
"Hail Caesar"
"Hells Bells"
"Hell Ain't a Bad Place to Be" (played three times)
"Dog Eat Dog" or "Down Payment Blues"
"The Jack"
"Ballbreaker"
"Rock and Roll Ain't Noise Pollution"
"Dirty Deeds Done Dirt Cheap"
"You Shook Me All Night Long"
"Whole Lotta Rosie"
"T.N.T."
"Let There Be Rock"

Encore
"Highway to Hell"
"For Those About to Rock (We Salute You)"

Tour dates

Cancelled dates

Box office score data

Personnel
Brian Johnson – lead vocals
Angus Young – lead guitar
Malcolm Young – rhythm guitar, backing vocals
Cliff Williams – bass, backing vocals
Phil Rudd – drums

Notes

References

Citations

Sources

AC/DC concert tours
1996 concert tours